Allen James Lewis (27 November 1916 – 20 December 1986) was an Australian rules footballer who played for the Richmond Football Club in the Victorian Football League (VFL).

Notes

External links 
		

1916 births
1986 deaths
Australian rules footballers from Victoria (Australia)
Richmond Football Club players
People from Horsham, Victoria